Blinisht is an Albanian toponym which may refer to:

Blinisht, Lezhë, a village in Lezhë municipality, Lezhë County
Blinisht, Mirditë, a village in Mirditë municipality, Lezhë County
Blinisht, Shkodër, a village in Pukë municipality, Shkodër County

See also
Blinishti family, a noble family in medieval Albania